WWF Superstars 2 is a video game based on the World Wrestling Federation (WWF), released in 1992 for the Game Boy handheld console by Acclaim Entertainment. It is the sequel to WWF Superstars and the second WWF game for the Game Boy system. The game is similar to WWF WrestleMania: Steel Cage Challenge for the Nintendo Entertainment System, although it runs much faster.

The game features six wrestlers: Hulk Hogan, "Macho Man" Randy Savage, The Undertaker, Sid Justice, Jake "The Snake" Roberts, and The Mountie.

Gameplay
WWF Superstars 2 features a more limited moveset than its predecessor. All wrestlers share the same moveset with no signature moves. Moves are limited to strikes (punching and kicking), grapples (headbutt, suplex, and bodyslam), ground attacks (stomp and elbow drop), Irish whip moves (clothesline and dropkick), and an aerial attack (flying elbow drop). Players can press the Select button once per match to regain strength.

Modes of play include one-on-one (standard and cage match variations), tag team, and tournament, where the player chooses a wrestler and must defeat the other five to win the WWF World Heavyweight Championship.

See also

 List of licensed wrestling video games
 List of fighting games

References

External links

1992 video games
Acclaim Entertainment games
Game Boy games
Game Boy-only games
LJN games
WWE video games
Multiplayer and single-player video games
Professional wrestling games
Video games developed in the United States